At the foot of the Wurmberg is the Brockenweg Ski Jump. This has two training jumps (K 7 and K 15), two artificial jumps (K 40 and K 58) and the derelict winter jump (K 70). The Braunlage Winter Sports Club (WSV Braunlage) hosts regional and international ski jumping here. All the jumps apart from K 70 are laid with mats.

Ski jump records

Wurmberg Ski Jump 

Near the summit of the Wurmberg is the Wurmberg Ski Jump which is a K90 and hosts the Continental Cup organised by FIS.

Ski jumping venues in Germany
Braunlage
Sports venues in Lower Saxony